Naranpura is an area in Ahmedabad City, in the state of Gujarat in western India. The area comes under Ahmedabad Municipal Corporation.  It is one of the oldest areas of the ever-growing western part of Ahmedabad.

It is predominantly filled with Hindus and Jains. Most of the people inhabiting Naranpura are Gujaratis. A substantial amount of Parsis, Sindhis, South Indians, Punjabis and Baloch Hindu migrants from Pakistan also live there.

Naranpura is a residential area. A railway line passes by this place to form its boundary. Many residential colonies dot this region of Ahmedabad.

Other places
 Naranpura, a village in Madhya Pradesh, India
Naranpura (Vidhan Sabha constituency), one of the 182 assembly constituency of Gujarat

Neighbourhoods in Ahmedabad